Senator Parnell may refer to:

Harvey Parnell (1880–1936), Arkansas State Senate
Sean Parnell (born 1962), Alaska State Senate